The Barbizon: The Hotel That Set Women Free is a 2021 book by Paulina Bren that examines the Barbizon Hotel for Women on the Upper East Side of Manhattan, New York City. The book has seven "positive" reviews, six "rave" reviews, and one "mixed" review, according to review aggregator Book Marks.

References

2021 non-fiction books
Simon & Schuster books
English-language books
History of women in New York City
Books about New York City